The 2017–18 Houston Cougars men's basketball team represented the University of Houston during the 2017–18 NCAA Division I men's basketball season. The Cougars were led by fourth-year head coach Kelvin Sampson as members of the American Athletic Conference. Due to renovations to the Cougars home arena, Hofheinz Pavilion, they played their home games at the H&PE Arena on the campus of Texas Southern University.

The Cougars ended the season with a record of 27–8.  They tied for second place in regular-season conference play with a record of 14–4.  As the No. 3 seed in the AAC tournament, Houston advanced to the final game, losing 56–55 to the Cincinnati Bearcats.  The Cougars earned a No. 6 seed in the West Regional of the NCAA tournament, where they advanced to the second round before falling to the Michigan Wolverines by a score of 64–63.

Previous season
The Cougars finished the 2016–17 season 21–11, 12–6 in AAC play to finish in third place. They lost to UConn in the quarterfinals of the AAC tournament. They received an at-large bid to the National Invitation Tournament as a No. 2 seed and lost in the first round to Akron.

Offseason

Departures

Incoming Transfers

Class of 2017 signees

Class of 2018 signees

Roster

Schedule and results

|-
!colspan=12 style=|Exhibition

|-
!colspan=12 style=| Non-conference regular season

|-
!colspan=12 style=| AAC regular season

|-
!colspan=12 style=| AAC Tournament

|-
!colspan=12 style=| NCAA tournament

Rankings

^Coaches Poll did not release a Week 2 poll at the same time AP did.
*AP does not release post-NCAA tournament rankings.

References

Houston
Houston Cougars men's basketball seasons
Houston
Houston
Houston